Arutua Airport is an airport on Arutua atoll in French Polynesia . The airport is 13 km north of the village of Rautini.

Airlines and destinations

Statistics

See also
 List of airports in French Polynesia

References

External links
 

Airports in French Polynesia